The Sea People is an accessory for the Dungeons & Dragons fantasy role-playing game.

Contents
The Sea People is a supplement and campaign setting that details the underwater realm at the bottom of the Sea of Dread and its inhabitants.

Publication history
PC3 The Sea People was written by Jim Bambra, with a cover by Lakey, and was published by TSR in 1990 as two 48-page booklets and an outer folder.

Reception
In the June 1990 edition of Games International, the reviewer thought this supplement "reflects the looser approach of D&D over AD&D", and noted the "friendly fictional style."

References

Dungeons & Dragons sourcebooks
Mystara
Role-playing game supplements introduced in 1990